Calapor is a census town in North Goa district  in the state of Goa, India. Gusto

Demographics
 India census, Calapor had a population of 11,823. Males constitute 50% of the population and females 50%. Calapor has an average literacy rate of 80%, higher than the national average of 59.5%; with male literacy of 85% and female literacy of 76%. 10% of the population is under 6 years of age.

References

Cities and towns in North Goa district